Penrith City Soccer Club, an association football club based in Penrith, Sydney, was founded in 1984 as the Penrith Panthers Rugby League Club. They were admitted into the National Soccer League for the 1984 season and was taken over by a Uruguayan consortium and being renamed Penrith Uruguayan. This last incarnation lasted until 1989, when the club became defunct.

Peter Brogan held the record for the greatest number of appearances for Penrith City. Between 1984 and 1985, the Australian defender played 54 times for the club. Three other players made 50 or more appearances for Penrith City. The club's goalscoring record was held by Brian Jackson and Ian Wotherspoon, who scored nine goals in all competitions.

Key
 The list is ordered first by date of debut, and then if necessary in alphabetical order.
 Appearances as a substitute are included.

Players

References
General
 

Specific

Penrith City SC players
Penrith City
Association football player non-biographical articles